Amaro Rodríguez-Felipe y Tejera Machado (3 May 16784 October 1747), better known as Amaro Pargo, was a famous Spanish corsair. He was one of the most renowned corsairs in Spain of the Golden Age of Piracy.

He was noted for his commercial activities and for his frequent religious donations and aid to the poor. In his role as a privateer, he dominated the route between Cádiz and the Caribbean, on several occasions attacking ships belonging to enemies of the Spanish Crown (mainly England and Holland), earning recognition in his time as a hero and coming to be regarded as "the Spanish equivalent of Francis Drake". He was declared a Caballero hidalgo in 1725 and obtained certification of nobility and royal arms in 1727.

Nickname 
For years there has been speculation as to the reason behind Rodríguez Felipe's nickname of Pargo. Traditionally, it has been believed that this pseudonym means that the raider was "fast", "elusive in battle" and "moving in the sea as the aforementioned fish", the red porgy (also called Pargo). More recent theories rooted in popular tradition have also attributed the nickname to the facial features of a corsair.

More recently, other theories have emerged; Professor Manuel de Paz at the University of La Laguna, and researcher & librarian Daniel García Pulido view Rodríguez Felipe's nickname as not having to do with his face resembling a fish, but with the nickname of his family's clan.

Biography

Early life 

Rodríguez Felipe was born in San Cristóbal de La Laguna, on the island of Tenerife (Canary Islands) on 3May 1678.

He was baptized by the priest Manuel Hurtado Mendoza in the Iglesia de Los Remedios (Church of Our Lady of Los Remedios, today a cathedral in the city). His godfather was Amaro López. He was the son of Juan Rodríguez Felipe and Beatriz Tejera Machado. He had seven brothers. Three of his sisters entered the Convent of Santa Catalina de Siena in the city. His family was affluent, possessing property both in and around the city.

Amaro lived with his family in the Plaza de San Cristóbal in La Laguna (also called "Plaza Tanque de Abajo"). The family had several possessions and houses, most of them located close to the political, economic, and religious center of the city, around the current Plaza del Adelantado (then called "Plaza de Abajo").

In 1701 he boarded as second lieutenant on a ship, the Ave María, nicknamed La Chata (The Barge), which was boarded by pirates. This ship was a galley of the King of Spain then on the route between the Caribbean and Cadiz. He advised the captain to feign surrender in order to start a battle from which they emerged victorious. In gratitude, the captain gave Amaro his first ship. With it he began his business activities, including participation in the African slave trade in Latin America. For this, Amaro Pargo obtained a letter of marque from King Philip V of Spain.

Trader and corsair 
Amaro Pargo's participation in the West Indies Fleet had to have started between 1703 and 1705, and at this time he is mentioned as "captain" and "master" of the frigate Ave María y Las Ánimas. He is mentioned sailing between the port of Santa Cruz de Tenerife and Havana, and other vessels of their possession are cited; Nuestra Señora de Los Remedios, Santo Domingo and Santa Águeda (this last nicknamed El Gavilán). Later in 1737 he is mentioned as the owner of El Mercader de Canarias, captained by John Plunket, and as sharing ownership with another merchant vessel of La Laguna, Don Pedro Dujardin.

He conducted his affairs with a well-maintained fleet and also with many residences. Amaro Pargo led his own ships to America laden with wine from Malvasía (which were from his own harvests) and brandy (also his), which he sold in Havana and Guyana. On the way, he attacked all ships belonging to enemies of Spanish Crown, mainly British and Dutch, making off with booty, which he later brought back to Spain. Amaro Pargo fought against some of the best known pirates of his day, including Blackbeard. He also traded in other products such as various textiles and even nuts. These products were brought from the Canary Islands to the Indies.

In 1712 Amaro Pargo captured an English ship, the Saint Joseph, which had its consignees in Dublin (Ireland), and was commanded by the English captain Alexander Westher. However, Amaro Rodríguez Felipe was accused of not having acted with rigor at the time of exercising his corsairs' rights. This was because Amaro Pargo had sacked the ship and seized its possessions, in addition to forcing Alexander Westher to sail along with Amaro Pargo's ship to the port of Santa Cruz de Tenerife, on pain of sinking the aforementioned English ship in the depths. Nevertheless, the capture of this English ship was considered legitimate because England was an enemy power of the Spanish Crown.

The Spanish monarch Felipe V, in a Royal Decree dated in San Lorenzo de El Escorial on 24 October 1719, authorized Amaro Pargo to build a ship in Campeche. This ship was a merchant armed with 58 guns and 64 cubits long and 56 keel, with more than 16 manga. According to current studies, said ship became part of the Navy in 1723, but just a year before it had approached and looted a Dutch ship, the Duyvelant, when it is believed to have been captained by Amaro Rodríguez Felipe.

This systematic looting of enemy ships sometimes escalated into battle; it is documented that once Amaro Pargo boarded a great ship from Jamaica, triggering a clash between the privateer Snapper and the captain of the ship with sabers and pistols and which ended with the captain seriously wounded and Pargo with only a cut on his fingers. He also fought against Turkish pirates in waters off the Canary Islands.

Pargo became romantically involved with the Cuban Josefa María del Valdespino, with whom he had an illegitimate son, but did not marry. This son was named Manuel de la Trinidad Rodríguez. Another illegitimate son was Juan Rodríguez Felipe born in Santa Cruz de Tenerife and who would be buried in the parish of St. Mark in Tegueste. Juan Rodríguez's mother was a married woman who had known Amaro's family since childhood, according to the documents of the time. This offspring would, however, be raised by the mother of Amaro Pargo, Mrs. Beatriz Tejera.

Amaro Pargo founded a chaplaincy for the needy and allocated 3,000 reales for the poor in the prisons. Pargo eventually came to be the richest man of the Canary Islands. He was a character who in his day had the same reputation and popularity as that of Blackbeard and Francis Drake.

Access to the nobility 
On 25 January 1725 Amaro Pargo was declared Caballero hijodalgo. In addition, Pargo obtained the actual certification of Nobility and Arms also given in Madrid on 9January 1727, by Juan Antonio de Hoces Sarmiento, who was chronicler and king of arms of Felipe V of Spain.

Friendship with Sister Mary of Jesus 

Moreover, because of his beliefs as a fervent Catholic, he was responsible for important works of charity for churches, religious institutions, and the Parroquia de Nuestra Señora de Los Remedios (Parish Church of Our Lady of Los Remedios), now the Catedral de San Cristóbal de La Laguna (La Laguna Cathedral). He began a deep friendship with the nun Sister Mary of Jesus, who gave the privateer spiritual advice. After her death in 1731, Amaro paid for the extravagant sarcophagus in which the uncorrupted mystic now rests. The initials of Amaro are inscribed in the sarcophagus.

The privateer attributed many of his exploits to the miraculous intervention of the nun, including an episode in which the nun saved his life in Cuba, without her body leaving the convent, that is, by the phenomenon of bilocation.

Over the centuries those searching for romance have wanted to see a deeper meaning in the friendship that joined the privateer and nun. Balbina Rivero, author of Amaro Pargo, el pirata de Tenerife, suggests that interpretation in his book. Others reject it, including the author of El Sarcófago de las tres llaves, Pompeyo Reina Moreno, saying their friendship was based on devotional reasons.

Death and inheritance 
Amaro died 4 October 1747 in his hometown. According to chronicles, his funeral was "very solemn" and during the funeral procession transferring his body to his burial site eight stops were made on the street, slowed down by the crowd that accompanied the procession.

He was buried in the Santo Domingo de Guzmán Convent in LaLaguna, in a family tomb.

In the marble headstone is engraved the family shield, and under it a skull winking his right eye with two crossbones. At his death his estate was substantial, and the natural son Manuel de la Trinidad Rodríguez appeared in LaLaguna demanding his part, but the rest of his heirs rejected his claims.

Treasure of Amaro Pargo 
Pargo wrote in his will that he had a box that he kept in his cabin. This carved chest contained silver, gold jewelry, pearls and precious stones of great value, chinese porcelain, rich fabrics and paintings, adding that they were itemised in a book wrapped in parchment and marked with the letter "D". The whereabouts of this book is unknown.

In the centuries since, people have speculated as to the whereabouts of the treasure. The house of Amaro Pargo in Machado (in the municipality of El Rosario) was sacked over the years by treasure hunters. It has also been suggested that the treasure is in the so-called Cave of San Mateo in Punta del Hidalgo northeast of Tenerife, a cave that served to hide their loot.

Despite all these efforts, this treasure has not yet been located.

Exhumation 

In November 2013, an exhumation was carried out by a team of archaeologists and forensic scientists from the Autonomous University of Madrid, to carry out a study on the pirate, including DNA tests and the recreation of his face.

According to historic records, Pargo was buried alongside his parents and a black servant. It was discovered, however, that apart from these, there were six more people, as well as some incomplete remains of babies. It is believed that some of these people were nephews or great nephews of Amaro Pargo, although it is known that the babies were not related to the privateer. The fact that they are buried together with the corsair is possibly due to a custom that took root all over Spain and the Canary islands to bury unbaptized children next to an adult, in the belief that the adult would guide them to Heaven.

The exhumation was funded by the French video game company Ubisoft, for the promotion of the sixth installment of their Assassin's Creed  video game series, Assassin's Creed IV: Black Flag and Naughty Dog's popular gaming franchise Uncharted. According to a supervisor of the company, Pargo was "a character who in his time had the same reputation and popularity as Blackbeard or Francis Drake".

In popular culture

Literature 
The dedication of Amaro Pargo to merchant and corsair activities has attracted the interest of several novelists and historians, who have observed a certain degree of mysticism in their person. Emphasizes among all for its historical rigor the work El corsario Amaro Pargo by Domingo Barbuzano, who spent five years to investigate the character in historical archives as the Indies in Seville, where all documentation of travel between Spain and America is kept.

Among the novels inspired by him are Amaro Pargo, el pirata de Tenerife by Balbina Rivero, and El Sarcófago de las Tres Llaves by Pompeyo Reina, and the Argentine writer Ernesto Frers makes reference to Amaro Pargo in his work Más allá del legado pirata.

Film and television 

In 1989, Televisión Española en Canarias broadcast a television series called La historia en persona. This series consisted of thirteen episodes, one of which was dedicated to the figure of Amaro Pargo.

More recently in 2017, the first documentary film that analyzes different vital aspects of this historical character was filmed, which is entitled Amaro Pargo: entre la leyenda y la historia. This documentary was broadcast directly on television in August 2017 through Televisión Canaria.

Music and theater 
The musical group Rincón de La Mareta dedicated a song to the corsair in 2016. In it, composed by Raquel Álvarez, the story of Amaro Pargo, his fortune and his passage through Cuba is narrated.

In the theatrical play La Conquista más pirata of Timaginas Teatro, Amaro Pargo shares the limelight with Rear Admiral Horacio Nelson, the Catholic Monarchs and Alonso Fernández de Lugo.

In the year 2022, in the month of May, coinciding with Amaro's birth anniversary, an album dedicated entirely to his figure called El Corsario de Aguere is released, under the direction and musical production of Raquel Álvarez.

Others 
In 2017, the Ruta Gastronómica de Amaro Pargo was presented in the city of La Laguna, a gastronomic route set in 18th-century cuisine and inspired by the figure of the corsair.

The City Council of San Cristóbal de La Laguna launched in 2021 an interactive video game entitled El tesoro de Amaro Pargo, which allows you to discover the main historical-artistic values of this city, declared a World Heritage Site by UNESCO in 1999.

See also 

 Cabeza de Perro
 Miguel Enríquez (privateer)

Citations

Bibliography

External links 
 El corsario Amaro Pargo
 La evolución de una fortuna indiana: D. Amaro Rodríguez Felipe (Amaro Pargo)
 El corsario de Dios. Documentos sobre el corsario Amaro Rodríguez Felipe (1678–1747)

17th-century pirates
18th-century pirates
1678 births
1747 deaths
People from San Cristóbal de La Laguna
Spanish slave traders
Spanish pirates